Geoff Cox (born 13 March 1951) is an Australian musician and media personality. He is often referred to as "Coxy".

Cox is most notable for having played drums with Brian Cadd, and with the bands Cycle, The Bootleg Family Band and Avalanche. He also filled in as drummer with the Little River Band while Derek Pellicci recovered from burns following a barbecue accident. He later became a light entertainment presenter on the Seven Network. In the 2000s, he hosted the travel program Coxy's Big Break.

Cox has been an Australia Day Ambassador. He has supported other charitable causes, including the Cabrini Institute and Zoos Victoria.

In 2008, Cox survived bowel cancer.

One of his earliest TV performances was on Countdown, in a short documentary which led viewers through the process of making Australian Crawl's music single, "Beautiful People".

References

Further reading
about coxy

1951 births
Living people
Little River Band members
Australian rock drummers
Male drummers
Musicians from Melbourne
Television personalities from Melbourne